The 2010 Africa Cup of Nations, also known as the Orange Africa Cup of Nations for sponsorship reasons, was the 27th Africa Cup of Nations, the biennial football championship of Africa (CAF). It was held in Angola, where it began on 10 January 2010 and concluded on 31 January.

In the tournament, the hosts Angola were to be joined by 15 nations who advanced from the qualification process that began in October 2007 and involved 53 African national teams. The withdrawal of Togo after a terrorist attack on their bus upon arriving for the tournament reduced the number of participating nations to 15. A total of 29 games were played, instead of the scheduled 32 games. Egypt won the tournament, their seventh ACN title and an unprecedented third in a row, beating Ghana 1–0 in the final.

Host selection
Bids :
Angola
Gabon / Equatorial Guinea
Libya
Nigeria

Rejected Bids :
Benin / Central African Republic
Botswana
Mozambique
Namibia
Senegal
Zimbabwe

On 4 September 2006, the Confederation of African Football (CAF) approved a compromise between rival countries to host the Africa Cup of Nations after it ruled out Nigeria. CAF agreed to award the next three editions from 2010 to Angola, Equatorial Guinea, Gabon and Libya respectively. They assigned Angola in 2010, Equatorial Guinea and Gabon, which submitted a joint bid in 2012, and Libya for 2014.

This edition was awarded to Angola to encourage the country to move towards peace after the Angolan Civil War.

Two-time former host Nigeria was the reserve host for the 2010, 2012 and 2014 tournaments, in the event that any of the host countries failed to meet the requirements established by CAF, although this ended up being unnecessary

The 2014 tournament was pushed forward to 2013 and subsequently held in odd-numbered years to avoid year-clash with the FIFA World Cup.

Qualification

The Confederation of African Football announced that the 2010 FIFA World Cup qualification would also be the qualification for this tournament. Despite the fact Angola were the host of the 2010 Africa Cup of Nations, they also needed to participate in the 2010 FIFA World Cup qualification. South Africa suffered the same situation, being the hosts for the World Cup but still needing to compete in qualification in order to qualify for the 2010 Africa Cup of Nations.

Qualified teams

 (hosts)

 (withdrew)

Venues

Draw
The draw for the final tournament took place on 20 November 2009 at the Talatona Convention Centre in Luanda, Angola. The 16 teams were split into four pots, with Pot 1 containing the top four seeded nations. Angola were seeded as hosts and Egypt as reigning holders. The remaining 14 teams were ranked based on their records in the three last editions of the competition. Cameroon and Ivory Coast had the two strongest records and so completed the top seeded Pot 1. The four seeded teams were placed into their groups in advance of the final draw.

Match officials
The following referees were chosen for the 2010 Africa Cup of Nations.

Squads

Group stage

Tie-breaking criteria
If two or more teams end the group stage with the same number of points, their ranking is determined by the following criteria:
 points earned in the matches between the teams concerned;
 goal difference in the matches between the teams concerned;
 number of goals scored in the matches between the teams concerned;
 goal difference in all group matches;
 number of goals scored in all group matches;
 fair play points system taking into account the number of yellow and red cards;
 drawing of lots by the organising committee.

All times given as local time (UTC+1)

Group A

Group B

Group C

Group D

Knockout stage

All times given as local time (UTC+1)

Quarter-finals

Semi-finals

Third place play-off

Final

Awards
Best player of the competition:  Ahmed Hassan
Fair Play player of the competition:  Ahmed Fathy
Discovery Player of the Tournament:  Gedo
Goalkeeper of the competition:  Essam El-Hadary
Top scorer:  Gedo

Best XI
The following players were selected as the best in their respective positions, based on their performances throughout the tournament. Their performances were analysed by the tournament's Technical Study Group (TSG), who picked the team.

Substitutes
 Richard Kingson
 Gedo
 Emmanuel Mbola
 Karim Ziani
 Achille Emaná
 Kwadwo Asamoah
 Seydou Keita
 André Ayew
 Éric Mouloungui
 Chinedu Obasi
 Salomon Kalou
 Jacob Mulenga

Goalscorers

5 goals
 Gedo

3 goals
 Flávio
 Ahmed Hassan
 Asamoah Gyan
 Seydou Keita

2 goals
 Manucho
 Samuel Eto'o
 Emad Moteab
 Russel Mwafulirwa
 Frédéric Kanouté
 Peter Odemwingie
 Jacob Mulenga

1 goal
 Hameur Bouazza
 Madjid Bougherra
 Rafik Halliche
 Karim Matmour
 Gilberto

1 goal
 Razak Omotoyossi
 Achille Emaná
 Geremi
 Mohammadou Idrissou
 Landry N'Guémo
 Didier Drogba
 Gervinho
 Salomon Kalou
 Kader Keïta
 Siaka Tiéné
 Mohamed Abdel-Shafy
 Hosny Abd Rabo
 Ahmed Elmohamady
 Mohamed Zidan
 Daniel Cousin
 Fabrice Do Marcolino
 André Ayew
 Davi Banda
 Elvis Kafoteka
 Mamadou Bagayoko
 Mustapha Yatabaré

1 goal
 Fumo
 Miro
 Obafemi Martins
 Chinedu Obasi
 Victor Obinna
 Yakubu
 Amine Chermiti
 Zouheir Dhaouadi
 James Chamanga
 Rainford Kalaba
 Christopher Katongo

Own goals
2 goals
 Dario Khan (playing against Benin and Egypt)
1 goal
 Aurélien Chedjou (playing against Tunisia)

Statistics
Total number of goals scored: 71
Average goals per match: 2.45
Most goals scored by a team in the first round: 7 –  and 
Most goals conceded by a team: 10 – 
Most goals conceded by a team in the first round: 7 – 
Fewest goals conceded by a team in the first round: 1 –  and *** and ***
Fewest goals conceded by a team continuing on to the second round: 2 – 
Most goals scored in a match: 8 –  4–4 
Most goals scored in a draw: 8 –  4–4 
Most goals scored by a winning team: 4 –  (4–0 vs. )

*** indicates the team played only two matches in the group stage, due to the withdrawal of Togo from the tournament.

Mascot

The Mascot for the Tournament is Palanquinha, which was inspired by the Giant Sable Antelope (Hippotragus niger variani), a national symbol and a treasured animal in Angola. In Angola, this animal is found only in the Cangandala National Park in Malange Province.

Match ball
The official match ball for the tournament is the Adidas Jabulani Angola, a modified version of the Adidas Jabulani to be used at the 2010 FIFA World Cup, with the colours of the flag of Angola.

Marketing
Tournament had seven sponsors, Doritos, MTN Group, NASUBA, Orange, Pepsi, Samsung and only African corporate sponsor Standard Bank.

Attack on the Togo national team

On 8 January 2010, the team bus of the Togo national football team was attacked by gunmen in Cabinda, Angola as it travelled to the tournament. A spokesman for the Togolese football federation said assistant coach Améleté Abalo and press officer Stanislaud Ocloo had died as well as the driver. The separatist group Front for the Liberation of the Enclave of Cabinda-Military Position (FLEC-PM) claimed responsibility for the attack. The Togolese team withdrew from the competition the following day. The players initially decided to compete to commemorate the victims in this way, but were immediately ordered to return by the Togolese government.

Following their departure from Angola, Togo were formally disqualified from the tournament after failing to fulfil their opening Group B game against Ghana on 11 January.

On 30 January 2010, CAF banned Togo from participating in the next two Africa Cup of Nations tournaments and fined the team $50,000 due to "government involvement in the withdrawal from the tournament". Togo were unable to compete until the 2015 tournament, but that ban was lifted on 14 May 2010 by a ruling from the Court of Arbitration for Sport.

References

External links

 Results at CAF web site
 Official Site 
 Dossier on African Cup of Nations – Radio France Internationale
 African Cup of Nations Guide
 African Cup of Nations – 
 2010 Africa Cup of Nations at ESPN 

 
International association football competitions hosted by Angola
Nations
2010
2010 in Angolan football
January 2010 sports events in Africa